Abani is both a given name and a surname. Notable people with the name include:

Abani Chakraborty (1941–?), Indian poet
Abani Mohan Joardar (died 2020), Indian politician
Abani Mukherji (1891–1937), Indian communist
Abani Roy (1939–2021), Indian politician
Chris Abani (born 1966), Nigerian-American author